The Tumara is a river in the Sakha Republic (Yakutia), Russia, a right tributary of the Aldan, part of the Lena basin. It flows across an area that is largely desolate, except for Segyan-Kyuyol village. The river is a destination for rafting.

The name of the river comes from the Yakut language tumara, meaning "tundra".

Course
The Tumara originates in the slopes of the southwestern Verkhoyansk Range. In the upper section of its course the river displays all the characteristics of a mountain river, flowing roughly southwards within a deep and narrow valley bound by steep slopes that cuts across the Kelter (Көлтөр) and Munni (Мунний) ranges. 

After leaving the mountainous area in its middle course the Tumara flows through a floodplain and forms meanders, still following a generally southward direction. In its lower course the river expands and the floodplain becomes wider, its riverbed dividing into slowly-flowing arms. Finally the Tumara meets the right bank of the Aldan River, a little upstream from Batamay and downstream from river Kele.

See also
List of rivers of Russia
List of fossiliferous stratigraphic units in Russia

References

Rivers of the Sakha Republic
Verkhoyansk Range
Central Yakutian Lowland